Albin Herzog (1852–1909) was a Swiss mathematician who was director of the ETH Zurich.

Life and work 
Herzog studied in  the high schools of Steckborn and Frauenfeld. Between 1870 and 1874 he studied mathematics al Polytechnicum of Zurich and in 1875 he was awarded a doctorate from the University of Zurich. The same year he began teaching at Polytechnicum of Zurich, where he remained the rest of his life, as director of the Mechanical Technical Department and General Manager from 1895 to 1899.

Herzog was an outstanding professor who connected the mathematical basis of mechanics with his practical applications. He also published several articles on mathematical mechanics.

Besides his academic activities, Herzog was president of the escolar commission (1889–1993) and councilor of the city of Zurich.

References

Bibliography

External links 
 
 

19th-century Swiss mathematicians
20th-century Swiss mathematicians
1852 births
1909 deaths